The Blake and Amory Building is a historic commercial building at the corner of Temple Place and Washington Street in Downtown Crossing, historically the main shopping district of Boston, Massachusetts. The eleven-story building was designed by noted Boston architect Arthur Hunnewell Bowditch, and constructed in two phases between 1904 and 1908. The building is architecturally noted for its expanses of windows and Gothic details. Early tenants occupying its upper-level offices were predominantly associated with the garment and fabric trade, with the lower floors housing a variety of retail operations.

The building was listed on the National Register of Historic Places in 2014.

After an extensive renovation project, the Godfrey Hotel Boston opened in the historic Blake and Amory Building in 2016.

See also
 National Register of Historic Places listings in northern Boston, Massachusetts

References

External links
Hotels Downtown Boston | Godfrey Hotel | Boston, MA

Commercial buildings on the National Register of Historic Places in Massachusetts
Commercial buildings in Boston
Commercial buildings completed in 1908
Gothic Revival architecture in Massachusetts
National Register of Historic Places in Boston
1908 establishments in Massachusetts
Skyscrapers in Boston
Skyscrapers in Massachusetts